Eureka: An Exposition of the Apocalypse (commonly called Eureka) is a book written by John Thomas in 1861. Each chapter has been written expounding the corresponding chapter of the last book of the bible (Revelation, or Apocalypse in the Greek). Originally written in a three volume set, later editors published the work in 5 volumes. In earlier editions, Eureka included the Exposition of Daniel, which was later generally published as a separate work.

References

External links 
 Eureka
 eureka.bereans.org 
 Eureka volume 1
 Eureka volume 2
 Eureka volume 3
 www.genusa.com

19th-century Christian texts
Christadelphian books
1861 books
1861 in Christianity
Biblical criticism